Magico or Mágico may refer to:

Arts and entertainment
 Magico (manga), a Japanese manga series
 Mágico (album), an album by Charlie Haden
 Mágico: Carta de Amor, an album by Jan Garbarek, Egberto Gismonti and Charlie Haden
 Mr. Magico, member of the musical group Gwar
 Magico Vento, title character of the Italian comic book of the same name

People
 Mágico González (born 1958), Salvadorean former footballer nicknamed El Mágico (The Magical One)
 Kim Ho-chul (born 1955), South Korean former volleyball player and head coach nicknamed "magico"

See also
 Magica (disambiguation)

Lists of people by nickname